Adams Hollow Creek is a short tributary of the Delaware River meeting with it just upstream from Mill Creek in Bristol, Bucks County, Pennsylvania.

History
Former communities on the east side of the creek, Harriman and Pine Grove are now part of Bristol Borough.

The bridge carrying Radcliffe Street was built in 1911 to replace the former King's Bridge.

Crossings and bridges

See also
List of rivers of Pennsylvania
List of rivers of the United States
List of Delaware River tributaries

References

External links
http://www.buckscounty.org/government/ParksandRecreation/Parks/SilverLake

Rivers of Bucks County, Pennsylvania
Rivers of Pennsylvania
Tributaries of the Delaware River